Midnight Walk is a jazz album by drummer Elvin Jones recorded in 1966 and released on the Atlantic label. It features Jones in a quintet with his brother Thad on trumpet, tenor saxophonist Hank Mobley, pianist Abdullah Ibrahim and bassist Don Moore.

Track listing
 "Midnight Walk" (Arif Mardin) - 3:30 
 "Lycra Too?" (Stephen James) - 4:50 
 "Tintiyana" (Dollar Brand) - 5:45 
 "H.M. on F.M." (Hank Mobley) - 5:00 
 "Cross-Purpose" (Thad Jones) - 6:00 
 "All of Us" (Thad Jones) - 6:25 
 "Juggler" (Elvin Jones) - 4:30 
Recorded in New York City on March 23 (tracks 2-4 & 7) & March 24 (tracks 1, 5 & 6), 1966

Personnel
Elvin Jones  - drums 
Thad Jones - trumpet 
Hank Mobley - tenor saxophone
Dollar Brand - piano
Stephen James - electric piano (track 2)
Don Moore - bass
George Abend - percussion (tracks 1, 5 & 6)

References

Elvin Jones albums
1966 albums
Atlantic Records albums
Albums produced by Arif Mardin